Little England is a 2013 Greek period drama–romance film directed by Pantelis Voulgaris. The film is based on the novel of the same name by Ioanna Karystiani, Voulgaris' wife, and stars Pinelopi Tsilika, Sofia Kokkali, Aneza Papadopoulou and Andreas Konstantinou. The plot revolves around two sisters, Orsa and Moscha from the island of Andros, dubbed Little England because of its affluence, who are both in love with Spyros; it starts in the interwar period and ends in the 1950s.

The film achieved commercial success in Greece, as it was the second-highest-grossing film of 2013 and the first amongst the Greek films. Little England also met critical success domestically and abroad. It was nominated for thirteen Hellenic Film Academy Awards and won six, including the award for Best Film. Internationally, it dominated at the 2014 Shanghai International Film Festival, winning three Golden Goblet Awards for Best Feature Film, Best Director and Best Actress, and it is also nominated for a Satellite Award for Best Foreign Language Film. Little England was submitted by Greece for the Best Foreign Language Film at the 87th Academy Awards, but it was not nominated.

Plot
The action takes place on the island of Andros, where Orsa, 20 years old, and her younger sister, Moscha, live. Orsa is deeply in love with Spyros Matabes, a lieutenant, but she has never revealed her secret to anybody. On the other hand, Moscha dreams of leaving Andros and escaping women's fate of marrying sailors, who are usually away from their families. Their mother, Mina, who is married to a captain, considers love to be a trouble and, overriding their emotions, wants her daughters to make wealthy marriages. As a result, Orsa marries captain Nikos Vatokouzis, and Moscha to Spyros Matabes, a captain now with whom her sister is in love. The two women live in the family's duplex home and the forbidden love will harm their lives.

Cast
 Pinelopi Tsilika as Orsa Saltaferou
 Sofia Kokkali as Moscha Saltaferou
 Aneza Papadopoulou as Mina Saltaferou 
 Andreas Konstantinou as Spyros Maltabes
 Maximos Moumouris as Nikos Vatokouzis
 Vasilis Vasilakis as Savvas Saltaferos
 Christos Kalavrouzos as uncle Aimilios

Release
The film was released in Greece on 5 December 2013. It was also screened twice as closing film at the 36th Cairo International Film Festival on 17 and 18 November 2014.

Reception

Box office
Little England was a major hit in Greece, where it grossed $3,078,029, making it the second-highest-grossing film of 2013 in the country behind only The Hobbit: The Desolation of Smaug. The film grossed $537,314 in its opening weekend and topped the box office, while it stayed in top four in the following six weekends.

Critical response
Boyd van Hoeij of The Hollywood Reporter describes the film as "A woman's picture in the best sense of the word" and a "handsomely mounted and impeccably acted film."

Accolades
Little England dominated at the 2014 Hellenic Film Academy Awards, where it received thirteen nominations and finally won six awards, including that for Best Film. The film met great success at the 2014 Shanghai International Film Festival, where it was also announced as the Best Feature Film and won two more Golden Goblet Awards. The film was selected as the Greek entry for the Best Foreign Language Film at the 87th Academy Awards.

See also
 List of submissions to the 87th Academy Awards for Best Foreign Language Film
 List of Greek submissions for the Academy Award for Best Foreign Language Film

References

External links
 Official website 
 
 

2013 romantic drama films
2013 films
Films based on Greek novels
Films directed by Pantelis Voulgaris
Films set in Greece
Greek romantic drama films